James Thomas Watkins (born 20 May 1973 in Nottingham, England) is an English film director and screenwriter, best known for his work in horror films, most notably  The Woman in Black starring Daniel Radcliffe.

He wrote and directed the critically acclaimed thriller Eden Lake, starring Michael Fassbender and Kelly Reilly.  It won Best Horror Film at the 2009 Empire Awards, the Jury Prize at Sitges Fantasy Festival and Best Director at Fantasporto. He was nominated for the Douglas Hickox Award at the 2008 British Independent Film Awards.

Watkins has written scripts for Warner Bros., Working Title, Film4 and BBC Films.

Filmography
Film

Television

References

External links

1973 births
Living people
English film directors
English screenwriters
English male screenwriters
Horror film directors